Keyton is an unincorporated community in Coffee County, Alabama, United States. Most of Keyton lies within the Enterprise city limits.

History
A post office operated under the name Keyton from 1892 to 1903.

References

Unincorporated communities in Coffee County, Alabama
Unincorporated communities in Alabama